The 1984–85 season was Arsenal's 66th consecutive season in the top flight of English football.

Season summary

Arsenal's start to the 1984/85 season had been relatively promising, with eight wins in the first eleven league matches. Don Howe had taken over from Terry Neill in December 1983 and results had improved. At the end of October 1984 saw Arsenal looking like a team that could challenge for the title; they had reclaimed their place at the top of Division One. However, that good form soon dipped. After a 4-2 defeat at Old Trafford, Arsenal slowly began to fall. The season overall was a disappointment. Some decent league performances were undermined by a complete lack of consistency, and two embarrassing cup exits, to Second Division Oxford United in the League Cup, and Third Division York City in the FA Cup. York City's victory over Arsenal in the fourth round, still resonates as one of the competition's big shocks. A star-studded Arsenal-side, put together at a cost of more than £4.5 million and featuring eight internationals, arrived at Bootham Crescent on January 26, 1985. But on a snow-bound day in York, Arsenal met their match against a heroic side that defied the odds to record a 1–0 victory, with a last minute penalty by Keith Houchen.

1984-85 was Pat Jennings final season in his long and illustrious career. Arsenal played Oxford United away in the League Cup on Halloween night 1984 and Arsenal and Jennings in particular, had a real horror show. Arsenal got beat 3-2 and they were out the competition. John Lukic played the next game, before Jennings returned to the side for three more games. The last being up at Hillsborough, against Sheffield Wednesday on 25 November 1984. Lukic returned to the side against Luton Town 1 December 1984, and Jennings never played for Arsenal again.

Squad

Results

First Division

Football League Cup

FA Cup

Arsenal entered the FA Cup in the third round proper, in which they were drawn to face Hereford United.

Top scorers

First Division
  Tony Woodcock 10
  Brian Talbot 10
  Ian Allinson 10
  Charlie Nicholas 9
  Paul Mariner 7

References

External links
 Arsenal 1984–85 on statto.com

Arsenal
Arsenal F.C. seasons